The R49 (also sometimes known as the R47) is a provincial route in North West, South Africa that connects Mahikeng with the Botswana border at Kopfontein near Gaborone, via Zeerust.

Route
The R49 begins in the town centre of Mahikeng, at a junction with the N18 National Route and the R503 Road. It begins as Shippard Street, going eastwards to form the northern border of the Mafikeng Game Reserve. From the N18 junction, it goes east, then north-east, for 61 kilometres to meet the N4 National Route (Platinum Highway).

The N4 joins the R49 and they are one road north-east for 2 kilometres into the town of Zeerust as Church Street. In the Zeerust CBD, at the President Square junction (just before Zeerust Shopping Centre), the R49 leaves Church Street (N4; Platinum Highway) and becomes the road northwards. The R49 heads northwards for 103 kilometres to end at the Kopfontein Border Post, with Botswana's Capital City, Gaborone, on the other side of the border.

References

External links
 Routes Travel Info

49
Provincial routes in South Africa